Pterostylis erubescens, commonly known as the red sepaled snail orchid, is a species of orchid endemic to the south-west of Western Australia. Non-flowering plants have a rosette of leaves flat on the ground but flowering plants lack a rosette and have a single large green flower which turns reddish-brown as it ages, and has leaves on the flowering spike.

Description
Pterostylis erubescens is a terrestrial, perennial, deciduous, herb with an underground tuber and when not flowering, a rosette of leaves  in diameter. The flowers turn reddish-brown as they age. The dorsal sepal and petals are fused, forming a hood or "galea" over the column, the dorsal sepal with a tapered tip and the petals broadly flared. The labellum is relatively large but not visible from outside the flower. Flowering occurs from late July to September.

Taxonomy and naming
Pterostylis erubescens was first formally described in 2014 by David Jones and Christopher French from a specimen collected near Augusta and the description was published in Australian Orchid Review. The species had previously been known as Pterostylis sp. 'red flowered'. The specific epithet (erubescens) is a Latin word meaning "reddening" referring to the colour of the upper parts of the flowers of this species.

Distribution and habitat
The red sepaled snail orchid grows in forest, woodland and around granite outcrops between Mandurah and Albany in the Esperance Plains, Jarrah Forest, Swan Coastal Plain and Warren biogeographic regions.

Conservation
Pterostylis erubescens is listed as "not threatened" by the Government of Western Australia Department of Parks and Wildlife.

References

erubescens
Endemic orchids of Australia
Orchids of Western Australia
Plants described in 2014